Elections were held in Negros Island Region (Region XVIII) for seats in the House of Representatives of the Philippines on May 9, 2016.

Summary

Bacolod City

Lone District
Evelio Leonardia is the incumbent but he chose to run for mayor.

Negros Occidental
Each of Negros Occidental's 6 legislative districts will elect each representative to the House of Representatives. The candidate with the highest number of votes wins the seat.

1st District
Julio A. Ledesma IV is the incumbent and term-limited.

2nd District
Leo Rafael Cueva is the incumbent. He is running unopposed.

3rd District
Alfredo Abelardo Benitez is the incumbent.

4th District
Jeffrey Ferrer is the incumbent and term-limited. He is running for vice-governor of the province.

5th District
Alejandro Mirasol is the incumbent.

6th District
Mercedes Alvarez is the incumbent and running unopposed.

Negros Oriental
Each of Negros Oriental's three legislative districts will elect each representative to the House of Representatives. The candidate with the highest number of votes wins the seat.

1st District
Emmanuel Iway is the incumbent but he is running for mayor of La Libertad.

2nd District
George P. Arnaiz is the incumbent and term-limited. He running for governor instead.

3rd District
Pryde Henry Teves is the incumbent and term-limited. He is running for mayor of Bayawan instead. His party nominated his brother Arnulfo Teves Jr.

References

External links
Official COMELEC results 2016
COMELEC - Official website of the Philippine Commission on Elections (COMELEC)
NAMFREL - Official website of National Movement for Free Elections (NAMFREL)
PPCRV - Official website of the Parish Pastoral Council for Responsible Voting (PPCRV)

2016 Philippine general election
Lower house elections in the Negros Island Region